Monghall is a town in Anantnag tehsil in Anantnag district in the Indian union territory of Jammu and Kashmir. It is one of 105 villages in Anantnag Block along with villages like Bagh Nowgam and Haji Danter.

Kashmiri is the local language. People in the area also speak Urdu and Hindi.

See also
Anantnag District
Doru shahabad
Khanabal
Chowgam
Awantipora
Kulgam District
Fatehpora

References

Ancient Indian cities
Cities and towns in Anantnag district